Andrei Alekseyevich Titov (born 5 March 1996) is a Russian footballer.

Club career
He made his debut in the Russian Professional Football League for FC Metallurg Lipetsk on 20 July 2015 in a game against FC Avangard Kursk.

He made his Russian Football National League debut for FC Khimki on 5 August 2017 in a game against FC Tom Tomsk.

On 18 June 2022, Noah announced that Titov had left the club.

References

External links
 Profile by Russian Professional Football League

1996 births
Living people
Sportspeople from Ulyanovsk
Association football forwards
Russian footballers
FC Metallurg Lipetsk players
FC Khimki players
PFC Krylia Sovetov Samara players
FC Tyumen players
FC Noah players
Armenian Premier League players
Russian expatriate footballers
Expatriate footballers in Armenia
FC Akron Tolyatti players